Farmersburg Township is a township in Clayton County, Iowa, USA.  As of the 2000 census, its population was 605.

History
Farmersburg Township was first settled in 1846. The pioneering ornithologist Althea Sherman, who made the first detailed study of chimney swifts was from Farmersburg Township.

Geography
According to the USGS, it contains three cemeteries: Giard, National and Winkawitsch.

References

 USGS Geographic Names Information System (GNIS)

External links
 US-Counties.com
 City-Data.com

Townships in Clayton County, Iowa
Townships in Iowa
1846 establishments in Iowa Territory